"When the People Fell" is a science fiction short story by American writer Cordwainer Smith, set in his "Instrumentality" universe.  It was originally published in Galaxy Science Fiction magazine in April, 1959, and is collected in The Rediscovery of Man, and in the collection of which it is the title story. The story takes place relatively early in the Instrumentality timeline, and a "scanner Vomact" appears both in this story and the classic story "Scanners Live in Vain".

The story recounts, in "flashback" form  — an interview between a reporter and a crusty old-timer — a risky attempt by a future Chinese government to claim and settle the planet Venus, at a time when China is the only ethnic nation on Earth which has survived as a separate entity through a global nuclear war and a long dark age which followed.  The story implicitly compares Western and Chinese approaches to solving an impossible problem and has the Chinese solution succeed, but at a cost Westerners would find repugnant.

Plot summary
The setting is the type of benign Venus imagined before the first space probes penetrated the clouds of that planet.  Colonization has become stymied by the native inhabitants (loudies), who are apparently sentient bubbles that float around the landscape, getting in the way of human progress.  Attempts to communicate with them produce no response.  Confining them is useless (they drift back) and killing them produces a deadly explosion that contaminates a thousand acres (4 km²).  The non-Chinese authorities of the early Instrumentality government have no answer.

The ruler of Goonhogo (the entity that replaced China under the early Instrumentality) decrees that 82 million Chinesians (men, women, and children) be dropped from space, parachuting down to the surface.  Each one has a simple mission — herd the bubbles together.  Many die in the process, both in landing and from the bubbles exploding.  The rest corralled the loudies together into herds, where they eventually starve, wiping out the species.  Meanwhile, more Chinese parachute down with rice seeds and begin planting.  Eventually, by sheer weight of numbers, the Chinese conquer Venus.

Smith's point in the story is evidently to demonstrate how Chinese attitudes such as fatalism and obedience to authority, coupled with their large numbers, could outperform the "Yankee ingenuity" and "self-reliant individual" attitudes predominant in mainstream 1950s American science fiction of the time.  (However, it is implied that the separate Chinese government and Chinese ethnic identity of the time of the Venus colonization no longer exist in the same form by the time of the story's "frame" interview.)

Collection

In 2007, Baen Books released a 599-page collection titled When the People Fell in trade paperback format which contained this short story as well as 28 additional short works by Smith and an introductory essay by Frederik Pohl. It was re-released in 2012 in mass market paperback form with 848 pages. All of the story texts in this collection and its companion We, The Underpeople are derived from the revised and corrected NESFA Press editions of Smith's work in the 1990s.

References

External links
 
 
 "When the People Fell" at the Internet Archive

Short stories by Cordwainer Smith
1959 short stories
Works originally published in Galaxy Science Fiction